Saint Madelberte of Maubeuge (or Machtelberthe; died c. 705) was a 7th-century nun related to the Merovingian dynasty.
She became abbess of Maubeuge Abbey in the County of Hainaut, now in northern France near the Belgian border. She died in 705 or 706.

Life

Madelberte was the daughter of Saint  and Saint Waltrude.
Around 697 she succeeded her aunt, Saint Aldegonde, and her sister Saint Aldetrude, as abbess of Maubeuge.
Her feast day is 7 September.

Butler's account

The hagiographer Alban Butler wrote in his Lives of the Fathers, Martyrs, and Other Principal Saints (1866),

Notes

Sources

 

7th-century Frankish saints
7th-century Frankish nobility
705 deaths